Edward Dean Tackett Jr. (born August 7, 1992) is an American professional ten-pin bowler from Huntington, Indiana, now residing in Bluffton, Indiana. A member of the Professional Bowlers Association (PBA) since 2012, Tackett has won 19 PBA Tour titles, including three major championships, and is one of nine professional bowlers that have completed the PBA Triple Crown. He was named PBA Player of the Year for the 2016 season, and was runner-up for the award in 2017 and 2018. Tackett is right-handed and uses a cranker-style delivery. He is a pro staff member for MOTIV bowling balls, Turbo Grips, and Genesis kinesiology tape.

Amateur career 
Tackett was a member of Junior Team USA in 2011 and 2013, and made Team USA in 2018. At the 2018 WBT World Men's Championships in Hong Kong (November 24–December 5), Tackett won two gold medals: Trios (with teammates Kyle Troup and Andrew Anderson) and All-Events.

In the 2020 Weber Cup, Tackett was named MVP as Team USA defeated Team Europe, 23–18. After the European bowlers closed the gap to four points following an initial nine-point American lead, Tackett won his final two singles matches over Swede Jesper Svensson, including the clinching match. Overall in the event, Tackett participated in 13 of 41 matches, going 3–2 in singles, 5–1 in doubles, and 1–1 in team.

PBA career 
Tackett made four championship round appearances over the 2012–13 and 2014 seasons, but did not win a title. He was named the PBA Rookie of the Year for the 2012–13 season. His first PBA Tour title came on June 28, 2015, at the PBA Xtra Frame Lubbock Southwest Open.  Later in the 2015 season, Tackett qualified as the top seed for the PBA World Championship, but lost in the final match to Gary Faulkner Jr.

2016 
Tackett had a highly successful 2016 season.  He won his second career title on April 24 at the PBA Xtra Frame Storm Open. 

He captured his third title (and first on U.S. television) on September 10 at the PBA Fall Swing Bear Open, also winning an additional $10,000 a day later in the non-title King of the Fall Swing event. 

Tackett's fourth PBA title came in the PBA Team Challenge in Las Vegas, NV on November 1. (This was the first PBA team event to award individual titles to the winning players.) 

Tackett then won his first PBA major and fifth title overall at the PBA World Championship, on December 11 in Reno, NV. 

The four titles in 2016 helped E.J. earn PBA Player of the Year honors for the season. He is the third-youngest player (24) to be named Player of the Year, behind Billy Hardwick (1963) and Andrew Anderson (2018). Tackett led the Tour in wins (4) and earnings ($168,290), and was third in Tour average (224.49).

2017 
Tackett's run of victories continued into 2017, as he won the season's opening event on January 14 at the DHC PBA Japan Invitational. This was his sixth PBA Tour title. 

On February 19 in Shawnee, Oklahoma, Tackett won his second major and seventh PBA title overall at the Fire Lake PBA Tournament of Champions. 

Tackett continued his 2017 success with a win in the inaugural Main Event PBA Tour Finals on May 20. This invitational tournament featured the top eight players in PBA earnings from the start of the 2015 PBA Tour season through the 2017 USBC Masters. As the #2 seed, Tackett survived the round-robin and group stepladder matches, eventually defeating #1 seed Jason Belmonte in the three-game final. This was his third victory of 2017 and eighth title overall. 

Although he did not have a win in any of the seven Storm PBA Xtra Frame events in 2017, Tackett finished with the most points over the duration of the series, earning a $20,000 bonus and the Storm Cup. 

On November 19, Tackett won his ninth PBA title in the PBA Scorpion Championship, part of the World Series of Bowling in Reno, NV. 

Tackett duplicated his four titles (one major) from the previous season while making a career-high nine championship round appearances, amassing 2017 earnings of over $220,000.

2018 
Tackett won his tenth PBA title on July 2, 2018, at the PBA Xtra Frame Parkside Lanes Open in Aurora, Illinois. At age 25 years, 329 days, he is the fourth-youngest player in PBA history to reach the ten title plateau (behind Pete Weber, Mike Aulby and Wayne Webb). 

Tackett won his 11th PBA title on July 29, 2018, teaming with female professional Liz Johnson to win the Storm PBA/PWBA Striking Against Breast Cancer Mixed Doubles championship in Houston, Texas. 

Tackett won his 12th PBA title and third of the 2018 season at the FloBowling PBA Bear Open, held October 17–18 in Owasso, Oklahoma. 

Tackett was announced as a finalist for the 2018 PBA Player of the Year award, but the award was won by Andrew Anderson.

2019 
On January 6, 2019, Tackett won the World Bowling Tour Men's Finals, a non-title event in which the finalists are based on performance in global events throughout the previous season. 

On July 21, 2019, Tackett won the Barbasol PBA Tour Finals for the second time in three seasons, earning his 13th PBA Tour title.

2020 
Tackett qualified as the #1 seed for the finals of the 2020 PBA Players Championship, but lost the title match to Bill O'Neill by one pin, 233–232.

2021 
On August 1, 2021, Tackett and partner Danielle McEwan won the PBA-PWBA Striking Against Breast Cancer Mixed Doubles tournament, leading the event wire-to-wire (from opening round of qualifying through the finals). The win earned E. J. his 14th PBA Tour title.

2022 
After a historic performance in qualifiers, Tackett earned the #1 seed in the 2022 US Open. However, a disastrous performance in the title match led to him losing 232-165 against Anthony Simonsen. However, that would only delay Tackett’s 2022 title, as 
he and his partner Marshall Kent won the PBA WSOB XIII Roth-Holman Doubles Championship. The win earned E. J. his 15th PBA Tour title.

Tackett’s 2022 season was enough to get him the #3 seed in the 2022 PBA Playoffs, where he would face a struggling Jesper Svensson. However, after splitting the first two games, Tackett would lose in the roll-off 38-24 after a heart wrenching 2-4-6-10 leave in the 10th frame. 

On July 31, Tackett won his 16th PBA Tour title in the Storm Striking Against Breast Cancer Mixed Doubles tournament, with partner Diandra Asbaty. This was Tackett's third title in this event, and he has won with three different partners (Liz Johnson in 2018 and Danielle McEwan in 2021). 

Tackett led the 2022 PBA Tour with a 225.27 average, was third in points and seventh in earnings with $160,675.

2023 
Tackett would once again earn the #1 seed at the 2023 US Open, and would go on to defeat Kyle Troup in the championship round, 221-208. With this win, he became the ninth player in PBA history to capture the Triple Crown, thanks to his prior wins in the World Championship and Tournament of Champions in 2016 and 2017 respectively. 

On 17 February, Tackett won the PBA Shawnee Classic. After qualifying as the #1 seed, he defeated Dom Barrett 231–226 in the championship match to claim his 18th career title. 

On March 9, Tackett won the PBA Dave Small's Jackson (MI) Classic, defeating Anthony Simonsen in the final match with a convincing 277–199 victory. This gives Tackett three wins in the first five events of the 2023 PBA Tour season. Continuing his superb 2023 season, Tackett led the Tournament of Champions qualifying wire-to-wire to claim the top seed, only to lose the March 19 title match to Jason Belmonte.

Tackett has rolled 17 perfect 300 games in PBA competition through the 2019 season. He surpassed the $1 million mark in career PBA earnings during the 2021 season. He also owns nine PBA Regional Tour titles.

Professional wins

PBA Tour wins (19)

RO = After splitting the two-game final, Tackett won in a 9th/10th frame roll-off.

Major championships

Wins (3)

Results timeline
Results not in chronological order.

"T" = Tied for a place"C" = Central Region Finals"M" = Midwest Region Finals

World Series of Bowling

Wins (2)

Results timeline
Results not in chronological order.

"T" = Tied for a place

PBA Tour career summary

* As of 31 July 2022

Awards and honors
 2012–13 PBA Rookie of the Year
 2016 PBA Player of the Year
 2022 George Young High Average Award

References

External links
 Official website of the Professional Bowlers Association

American ten-pin bowling players
1992 births
Living people